Andrei Vasilievich Bushkov (born 13 October 1969) is a Russian former pair skater who represented the Soviet Union until its fall, and, after that, Russia. With partner Marina Eltsova, he is the 1996 World champion and a two-time (1993 and 1997) European champion. 

Eltsova / Bushkov missed the 1997–1998 Champions Series Final because Bushkov had a groin injury. They withdrew from the 1998 European Championships – Bushkov's right blade broke during the short program. The pair competed at the 1998 Winter Olympics, where they placed seventh. They were coached by Natalia Pavlova in Saint Petersburg.

Before teaming up with Eltsova, he competed internationally with Yulia Liashenko. They were the 1988 World Junior bronze medalists for the Soviet Union.

Competitive highlights
GP: Champions Series / Grand Prix

With Eltsova

With Liashenko

References

External links 

 Pairs on Ice: Marina Eltsova & Andrei Bushkov
 

Russian male pair skaters
Figure skaters at the 1998 Winter Olympics
Living people
Olympic figure skaters of Russia
Soviet male pair skaters
1969 births
World Figure Skating Championships medalists
European Figure Skating Championships medalists
World Junior Figure Skating Championships medalists
Universiade medalists in figure skating
Goodwill Games medalists in figure skating
Universiade gold medalists for the Soviet Union
Competitors at the 1991 Winter Universiade
Competitors at the 1994 Goodwill Games